Luyanó is a consejo popular (i.e. "popular council or ward") and a Section of populated place within the municipality of Diez de Octubre, Havana, Cuba.

References

Subdivisions of Havana